Karl Ivar Nordlund (2 February 1855 - 6 September 1937) was a Finnish Lutheran clergyman and politician, born in Närpes. He was a member of the Diet of Finland from 1905 to 1906 and of the Parliament of Finland from 1909 to 1912, representing the Swedish People's Party of Finland (SFP).

References

1855 births
1937 deaths
People from Närpes
People from Vaasa Province (Grand Duchy of Finland)
Swedish-speaking Finns
20th-century Finnish Lutheran clergy
Swedish People's Party of Finland politicians
Members of the Diet of Finland
Members of the Parliament of Finland (1909–10)
Members of the Parliament of Finland (1910–11)
Members of the Parliament of Finland (1911–13)
University of Helsinki alumni
19th-century Finnish Lutheran clergy